John Alexander "Ian" Pettitt (25 September 1910 – 25 December 1977) was an Australian politician. Born in Geelong, Victoria, he was educated at Geelong College before becoming a farmer at Harden, New South Wales. He served in the military from 1940 to 1943. In 1963, he was elected to the Australian House of Representatives as the Country Party member for Hume, defeating Labor member Arthur Fuller. He held the seat until 1972, when he was defeated by Labor's Frank Olley. He died on Christmas Day 1977.

References

National Party of Australia members of the Parliament of Australia
Members of the Australian House of Representatives for Hume
Members of the Australian House of Representatives
Australian Army personnel of World War II
1910 births
1977 deaths
20th-century Australian politicians
Australian Army soldiers